Matthew Spiller (born February 7, 1983) is a Canadian former professional ice hockey defenceman who played 68 games in the National Hockey League (NHL) with the Phoenix Coyotes and the New York Islanders. Spiller was originally selected 31st overall by the Coyotes in the 2001 NHL Entry Draft.

Playing career
Spiller played major junior hockey with the Seattle Thunderbirds in the Western Hockey League. Due to his hulking size and defensive promise, Spiller was selected as the first pick in the second round of the 2001 Entry Draft. In his rookie professional season, Spiller stepped straight into the NHL with the Coyotes in the 2003–04 campaign. Spiller spent the next three seasons within the Coyotes organization, playing primarily with American Hockey League affiliates.

On July 3, 2007, Spiller was signed as a free agent to a one-year deal with the New York Islanders. In the 2007–08 season, he featured in 9 games with the Islanders in what would be his last year in the NHL. Spiller later signed with the New Jersey Devils the following season, but was assigned to AHL affiliate, the Lowell Devils.

As a free agent, Spiller agreed to sign in the Czech Extraliga with HC Bílí Tygři Liberec, however failing to adapt to the European game after 8 games, he returned to the North American minor league ranks in joining the Bloomington PrairieThunder of the Central Hockey League for the 2009–10 season. Spiller spent two-years away from professional hockey before attempting a brief comeback in the ECHL with the Florida Everblades in the 2012–13 season.

Career statistics

Regular season and playoffs

International

Awards and honours

References

External links

1983 births
Arizona Coyotes draft picks
HC Bílí Tygři Liberec players
Bloomington PrairieThunder players
Bridgeport Sound Tigers players
Canadian ice hockey defencemen
Florida Everblades players
Living people
Lowell Devils players
Phoenix Coyotes players
New York Islanders players
San Antonio Rampage players
Seattle Thunderbirds players
Springfield Falcons players
Utah Grizzlies (AHL) players
Canadian expatriate ice hockey players in the Czech Republic
Canadian expatriate ice hockey players in the United States